Soul Winning and Prayer Union was a Protestant Christian missionary society, founded in 1880, that was involved in sending workers to countries such as China, Syria, and the New Hebrides during the late Qing Dynasty.

References

See also
 Protestant missionary societies in China during the 19th Century
Timeline of Chinese history
19th-century Protestant missions in China
List of Protestant missionaries in China
Christianity in China

Christian missionary societies
Christian missions in China